The chapters of the Japanese manga Domestic Girlfriend are written and illustrated by Kei Sasuga.



Volume list

References 

Domestic Girlfriend